The Players Tour Championship 2012/2013 was a series of snooker tournaments which started on 18 June 2012 and ended on 17 March 2013, with events held in England, across Europe and in China. In this season the European events formed the European Tour and events were held in China for the first time under the Asian Players Tour Championship name. The thirteen regular minor-ranking events were concluded with the Finals. The European Tour was sponsored by Betfair.

Schedule

Order of Merit

UK/Europe 

After 10 out of 10 events:

(Top 26 players out of 442)

Asian

After 3 out of 3 events:
(Top 8 players out of 113)

Finals

The Finals of the Players Tour Championship 2012/2013 took place between 12–17 March 2013 at the Bailey Allen Hall in Galway, Ireland. It was contested by the top 25 players on the Order of Merit, who have played in at least 5 events (2 in the UK and 3 in Europe); the three APTC winners and the top four from the Asian Order of Merit, who didn't win an APTC tournament. If a player qualified from both Order of Merits, than the highest position counted and the next player on the other list qualified. If a player finished on both lists on the same place, than the PTC Order of Merit takes precedence and the next player from the APTC Order of Merit qualified. If an APTC event winner, who qualified through the APTC Tour and finished in the top 25 on the PTC Order of Merit, then the next highest player on the PTC Order of Merit qualified. The seeding list of the Finals was based on the combined list from the earnings of both Order of Merits.

Notes

References